Moriah Aviation Training Centre (MATC), is an aviation training school in Uganda, that provides training for prospective pilots, cabin crew staff, aviation customer managers and related courses in the aviation industry.

Location
The geographical coordinates of the campus of Moriah Aviation Training Centre are: 00°06'07.0"N, 32°30'16.0"E (Latitude:0.101955; Longitude:32.504450).

Overview
The training institution is privately owned. The school was established to address the shortage of flight professionals in Uganda and the region. Graduates of MATC usually find employment with local and regional airlines.

Courses
, the following courses are offered at MATC: (a) Flight Operations Dispatch Course (b) Aircraft Maint
enance Engineers' Course  (c) Flight Instructor Techniques Course (d) Technical Stores Management Course (d) Basic Airport Fire Fighting Course.

See also
Uganda Aviation School
East African Civil Aviation Academy
List of aviation schools in Uganda

References

External links
 Website of Moriah Aviation Training Centre

Wakiso District
Aviation schools
Aviation schools in Uganda
Education companies established in 2015
2015 establishments in Uganda